Extrawettsteinina is a genus of fungi in the family Pleosporaceae.

It contains 2 species;
 Extrawettsteinina andromedae 
 Extrawettsteinina pinastri

References

Pleosporaceae